"Five Cs of Singapore" — namely, cash, car, credit card, condominium and country club membership — is a phrase used in Singapore to refer to materialism. It was coined as a popular observational joke during the 1990s about the aspirations of some Singaporeans to obtain material possessions in an effort to impress others.

In comparison, the "CMPHH" — namely, coin, MRT, public parks, HDB and hawker — is a phrase used in Singapore to refer to minimalism.

Overview

Cash 
Cash refers to spending power rather than physical currency. Financial security and affluence is a status symbol worldwide and for much of contemporary human history was the measure of personal worth and success.

Car 
Approximately 1 in 10 residents of Singapore own a car. Given high taxation on the import and ownership of motor vehicles (191% on new vehicles, an annual road tax based on engine size, and high pump prices) and a quota system requiring owners to acquire a costly Certificate of Entitlement. Hence, car ownership is a symbol of wealth and power especially in Singapore.

Credit card 
Credit cards are a visible symbol of success. Singapore's financial regulator, the Monetary Authority of Singapore (MAS), has stipulated a maximum personal credit limit of two months' income given personal income less than S$30,000, or four months' income for all others. Banks typically issue different types of cards depending on the available credit limit, associating greater cachet with cards that offer a higher limit.

Condominium 
In Singapore, privately developed apartments reflect a higher wealth status as compared to public housing also known as HDBs which are public flats built, sold and subsidized by the government. Up to 80% of Singaporeans live in public housing in the country, as land in Singapore is at a premium, meaning that freestanding houses are rare and signify even greater affluence, especially old money.

Country Club 
Relatively few country clubs, golf clubs, etc., which take up loads of space, are available in Singapore, making membership another indication of affluence.

New Five Cs
In 2019, it was published that a "new" Five Cs has emerged since the 2010s among Singaporean white-collar workers, with lesser emphasis on materialism. While cash was retained, other C's can now include culture, credibility, career and convenience, among others.

In a web conference of local newspaper Today in 2021, it has been argued that newer generations of Singaporeans are now less materialistic and do not value the original Five Cs as much, and that they have redefined what constitutes as success and priorities in life. A panellist added that they now opt to work for a job that they are passionate in, with the intention to "make a difference", rather than just working for a salary.

In 2022, MVNO (Mobile Virtual Network Operator) Circles.Life took to social media to introduce their definition of the new 5Cs with the aim to "reimagine the Singaporean dream" - Connected, Creative, Courageous, Compassionate and Carefree.

References 

Singaporean culture